Tochilin (f: Tochilina) is a Russian-language surname derived from the word tochilo, meaning 'grinder' or 'grindstone'. Notable people with this surname include:

 Aleksandr Tochilin (born 1974), Russian football coach and former player
 Pyotr Tochilin (born 1991), Russian football player
 Yevgeni Tochilin (born 1974), Russian film director and screenwriter

Russian-language surnames
ru:Точилин